Choi Wan Yu (born 5 April 1993) is a Hong Kong karateka. She won one of the bronze medals in the women's kumite 61 kg event at the 2018 Asian Games held in Jakarta, Indonesia.

At the 2017 Asian Karate Championships held in Astana, Kazakhstan, she won the silver medal in the women's kumite 61 kg event. In the final, she lost against Yin Xiaoyan of China.

Achievements

References 

Living people
1993 births
Place of birth missing (living people)
Hong Kong female karateka
Karateka at the 2018 Asian Games
Asian Games medalists in karate
Asian Games bronze medalists for Hong Kong
Medalists at the 2018 Asian Games
21st-century Hong Kong women